Tomás Cubelli (born June 12, 1989) is an Argentine rugby union footballer, who currently plays for Australian Super Rugby franchise Western Force, and the Argentina national team. Cubelli's playing position is Scrum-half.

Rugby career

Early career
Cubelli began his career with Belgrano Athletic Club, a rugby club based in Belgrano, Buenos Aires, the same club his father, Alejandro, played for.

After the introduction of an Argentinian team into South Africa's Vodacom Cup in 2010, Cubelli joined the team that would be eventual champions in 2011. Cubelli played seven games for Pampas XV scoring one try in the process during their undefeated campaign in the 2011 Vodacom Cup. Pampas XV defeated the Blue Bulls 14–9 in the final in the North West province at Olën Park, Potchefstroom. In 2012, Cubelli played all seven of the seven games Pampas XV competed in during the 2012 Vodacom Cup, scoring two tries. In 2013, however, Cubelli scored three tries in only eight games including one in the Quarter-finals against the Pumas. Pampas XV lost 44–37.

Brumbies
In November 2015, after current Brumbies and Australia national team scrum-half Nic White left the club for French Top 14 club Montpellier, the Brumbies, an Australian, Canberra-based Super Rugby franchise, signed Cubelli on a two-year deal as his replacement.

Cubelli was a significant part of the Brumbies squad during 2016, his first Super Rugby season. And earned high praise from coach Stephen Larkham, who described the Argentinean as the best running scrum-half in Brumbies history. Cubelli made his debut in round 1 of the 2016 season against the Hurricanes, scoring a try and helping the team to a 52–10 victory at GIO Stadium, Canberra. Cubelli's second try of the season came in round 11 against the Bulls of Pretoria. The Brumbies won 23–6 at home. Cubelli scored his third and final try of the 2016 season against Australian Super Rugby conference rivals, the Queensland Reds in round 15 at home once again, and put the scoreline to 34–17 and eventually help the Brumbies to win the match 43–24.

After a very successful debut season in 2016, Cubelli's 2017 season was much less memorable, having only played three matches the entire season in part due to a knee injury he suffered during pre-season. round 16 against the Reds, round 17 against the Chiefs and the Qualifying final against the Hurricanes.

Jaguares
After being injured during 2017 and not playing many minutes throughout the Brumbies' campaign, Cubelli subsequently left the club for his native Argentina for the following season, signing a contract until the end of 2019.

Western Force 
In October 2020 Cubelli was signed by Australian Super Rugby side Western Force to play in the 2021 Super Rugby AU season and Super Rugby Trans-Tasman.

International career

Cubelli made his international debut against Uruguay during the 2010 South American Rugby Championship in Santiago, Chile.

2015 Rugby World Cup

Cubelli was a part of the fourth placed Argentina team at the 2015 Rugby World Cup. An important player for Argentina during the 2015 Rugby World Cup, he was second choice scrum-half for most of the tournament behind Martín Landajo, however, Cubelli started in three of the seven games for Argentina, against New Zealand, against Georgia in which cubelli scored a try, and one in the third place match against South Africa in which they were defeated 24–13 at the Olympic Stadium, London. Cubelli scored two tries in the Pool stages, but unfortunately he could not help Argentina to a place above third.

Cubelli was a starter for the  national team on 14 November 2020 in their first ever win against the All Blacks.

Super Rugby Statistics

References

External links
 Tomás Cubelli at ESPN
 It's Rugby – Profile
 Los Pumas – Profile

1989 births
Living people
Rugby union players from Buenos Aires
Argentine rugby union players
Argentine people of Italian descent
Argentina international rugby union players
Rugby union scrum-halves
Pampas XV players
ACT Brumbies players
Argentine expatriate rugby union players
Expatriate rugby union players in Australia
Jaguares (Super Rugby) players
Western Force players
Biarritz Olympique players